Duncan Todd (born 14 May 1975) is a Hong Kong butterfly and medley swimmer. He competed in five events at the 1992 Summer Olympics.

References

External links
 

1975 births
Living people
Hong Kong male butterfly swimmers
Hong Kong male medley swimmers
Olympic swimmers of Hong Kong
Swimmers at the 1992 Summer Olympics
Place of birth missing (living people)